Wang Szu-yi (born Wang Hsin-ching on 11 December 1972), also known as Brenda Wang, is a Taiwanese actress and former model.

Career
Wang became a model in 1985. In 1989 she was named a "Top 10 model in Taipei". She started her acting career in the 1993 mega-hit Taiwanese TV series Justice Pao, but her breakout did not come until 1998, when she portrayed Pan Jinlian in the 1998 Chinese TV series The Water Margin. This role made her well known in mainland China, where she has based her career since.

In 2000, she appeared in a skit on CCTV New Year's Gala along with Pan Changjiang and Gong Hanlin, becoming the first Taiwanese actor to appear on China's most-watched annual television event.

Filmography

Films

Television

References

Chinese film crew comes to Vietnam
 春晚小品中的影视美女

External links
 weibo.com/wangsiyibeauty (verified Sina Weibo account)

 (same person)

Taiwanese television actresses
Taiwanese film actresses
20th-century Taiwanese actresses
21st-century Taiwanese actresses
Actresses from Kaohsiung
1972 births
Living people